The Journal of Critical Care is a peer reviewed medical journal which covers intensive care medicine.  It is the official journal of the World Federation of Societies of Intensive and Critical Care Medicine and the Society for Complex Acute Illness. The editor-in-chief is Jan Bakker. It is published every two months by Elsevier.

Abstracting and indexing

The journal is abstracted and indexed in:

According to the Journal Citation Reports, the journal has a 2013 impact factor of 2.191, ranking it 17th out of 27 journals in the category "Critical Care Medicine".

History
The journal was established in 1986. The first editor was David R. Dantzker and the original publisher was Grune & Stratton. In 2007 the Journal of Critical Care absorbed Seminars in Anesthesia, Perioperative Medicine and Pain which was previously titled Seminars in Anesthesia.

References

External links

World Federation of Societies of Intensive and Critical Care Medicine
Society for Complex Acute Illness

Emergency medicine journals
Publications established in 1986
English-language journals
Elsevier academic journals
Bimonthly journals